"My Name Is" is a song by American rapper Eminem from his second album The Slim Shady LP (1999). It is also the opening song and lead single of the album. The song samples British singer Labi Siffre's 1975 track "I Got The..." as a bass and guitar riff by British pop rock duo Chas & Dave. The song was ranked at #26 on "VH1's 100 Greatest Songs of the '90s". "My Name Is" was also ranked #6 on Q Magazine's "1001 Best Songs Ever". "My Name Is" peaked at number 36 on the Billboard Hot 100, becoming Eminem's first top 40 hit there. Outside the United States, "My Name Is" peaked within the top ten of the charts in Iceland, New Zealand, Norway, Ireland, and United Kingdom.

The song was placed at number 39 by Rolling Stone on their list of "100 Greatest Hip-Hop songs of all time" in April 2016.  The recording garnered Eminem his first Grammy Award for Best Rap Solo Performance at the 42nd Grammy Awards in 2000.

Background
The song contains a sample of Labi Siffre's track "I Got The ...". Siffre, who is openly gay, said in a 2012 interview that he refused to clear the sample until sexist and homophobic lyrics were removed from the song: "Dissing the victims of bigotry – women as bitches, homosexuals as faggots – is lazy writing. Diss the bigots not their victims." The original uncensored version of the song with the aforementioned offending lyrics is mistakenly included on the 1999 release The Source Hip Hop Music Awards 1999. The bass and guitar riff used in the sample was performed by Siffre's session musicians Chas Hodges and Dave Peacock, who later became the duo Chas & Dave. "My Name Is" is written in the key of F major. Famous names referenced in the song include Nine Inch Nails, the Spice Girls, and Pamela Anderson (Pamela Lee).

Music video
The video premiered on MTV Total Request Live on January 21, 1999. It was directed by Phillip Atwell, who would later direct music videos for several other Eminem  songs, including "The Real Slim Shady", "Stan", "Lose Yourself", and "Just Lose It". The video starts out with a stereotypical redneck family watching television, who then come across a show starring "Marshall Mathers" (Eminem's real name). As the video goes on, Eminem parodies several TV shows and movies. He also imitates then-President of the United States Bill Clinton, Johnny Carson, a porn star, and others. Basketball player Gheorghe Mureșan has a cameo appearance as a ventriloquist with Eminem being used as the dummy in the scene. Dr. Dre, the song's producer, also has a cameo as a doctor. It also features a Monica Lewinski lookalike, and Eminem imitating a chemistry teacher. Eminem is seen wearing a red tuxedo in some parts of the video, something that he would pay homage to in his 2020 single “Gnat”, 21 years after “My Name Is” was originally released.

The video was ranked #71 in NME's 100 Greatest Music Videos. As of 2019, the music video has been replaced on all official sites (including the official Eminem YouTube account and MTV's holding accounts) with alternative lyrics online making it more advertiser friendly.  Lines such as, "Well, since age 12, I felt like I'm someone else
'Cause I hung my original self from the top bunk with a belt," are replaced with "Since age 12 I felt like a caged elf
Who stayed to himself in one space, chasing his tail," also with lines referencing ripping Pamela Lee's tits off replaced with ripping her lips off and kissing them, saying how they feel soft like silicon.

Critical reception
AllMusic's Stephen Thomas Erlewine singled out the song as an album highlight, while Entertainment Weekly’s David Browne wrote that this single and its accompanying video were both "attention-grabbing".

In 2002, Eminem said of the song: "I didn’t hate that song when I first made it. But the shit that I really, really like, that I put my heart and soul into, I don’t get recognized for, like 'The Way I Am.' There's a difference between me being funny and me being real. I feel like I don't get recognized for my best shit — the shit that's my real, true feelings and emotions."

Track listing
UK CD1

UK CD2

UK Cassette

12" single

Record Store Day 2020 7" single

Notes
 signifies a co-producer.

Controversy
Eminem's mother Debbie Mathers filed a $10 million slander lawsuit against him for insinuating that she does drugs in the lyrics "99% of my life I was lied to, I just found out my mom does more dope than I do".
Eminem also berates his mother in the third verse of the song, with the lyrics "When I was little I used to get so hungry I would throw fits/How you gonna breastfeed me, Mom?! You ain't got no tits!" Debbie stated in her 2008 book My Son Marshall, My Son Eminem, "This line was horrible and upsetting, because I'd contracted toxemia-blood poisoning when I gave birth to him and hadn't been able to breast-feed." The lawsuit was settled in 2001 for $25,000, of which Debbie received only $1,600, after Judge Mark Switalski ruled that $23,354.25 of the $25,000 settlement should go to Fred Gibson, Debbie's former attorney. Eminem would later reference this in his 2002 song "Without Me" with the lyrics, "I just settled all my lawsuits, fuck you Debbie!"

Awards and nominations

Charts

Weekly charts

Year-end charts

Certifications

References

External links

Eminem songs
1999 singles
Grammy Award for Best Rap Solo Performance
Song recordings produced by Dr. Dre
Songs written by Labi Siffre
Songs written by Eminem
Aftermath Entertainment singles
Interscope Records singles
Horrorcore songs
Songs written by Dr. Dre
1999 songs
Comedy rap songs
American hip hop songs
Songs about drugs
Songs about parenthood
Obscenity controversies in music
Songs about fictional male characters